Sar-e Pol, Sar-i-Pul Sari-Pul or Saripul may refer to the following places:

Afghanistan
 Sar-e Pol Province
 Sar-e Pol District in Sar-e Pol Province
 Sar-e Pol, Afghanistan, capital of Sar-e Pol Province

Iran
 Sar-e Pol, Golestan
 Sar-e Pol, Kerman
 Sar-e Pol, Zanjan

See also
 Sarpol-e Zahab, Kermanshah Province, Iran
Sarpol-e Zahab County, an administrative subdivision of Iran